This is a list of Maximum Fighting Championship (MFC) events held in 2012.

List of events
Maximum Fighting Championship held four events throughout 2012.

Events

MFC 32

MFC 32 - Bitter Rivals was held on January 27, 2012, at the Mayfield Inn Trade and Conference Centre in Edmonton, Alberta.

Background

Antonio McKee was stripped of his MFC Lightweight Championship after he failed to make weight. He still went on to fight Brian Cobb who was originally schedule to fight for the championship.

The main event consisted of a non-title bout between Wilson Gouveia and Dwayne Lewis that was scheduled to be for five five-minute rounds.

Results

MFC 33

MFC 33 - Collision Course was held on May 4, 2012, at the Mayfield Inn Trade and Conference Centre in Edmonton, Alberta.

Background

The main event featured Ryan McGillivray and Nathan Coy fighting for the vacant MFC Welterweight Championship

Results

MFC 34

MFC 34 - Total Recall was held on August 10, 2012, at the Mayfield Inn Trade and Conference Centre in Edmonton, Alberta.

Background

The main event was expected to feature a rematch between Adam Lynn and Mukai Maromo for the vacant MFC Lightweight Championship. However, Lynn missed weight at the weigh in, thus relegating their five round title fight, to a three round non-title affair.

UFC veteran Tim Hague retired after this event.

Results

MFC 35

MFC 35 - Explosive Encounter took place on October 26, 2012, at the Mayfield Inn Trade and Conference Centre in Edmonton, Alberta.

Background

The main event saw Joseph Henle fighting Elvis Mutapčić for the vacant MFC Middleweight Championship.

Results

Maximum Fighting Championship (2013) Events

MFC 36

MFC 36 - Reality Check took place on February 15, 2013, at the Mayfield Inn Trade and Conference Centre in Edmonton, Alberta.

Results

MFC 37

MFC 37 - True Grit took place on May 10, 2013, at the Mayfield Inn Trade and Conference Centre in Edmonton, Alberta.

Results

MFC 38

MFC 38 - Behind Enemy Lines took place on October 4, 2013, at the Mayfield Inn Trade and Conference Centre in Edmonton, Alberta.

Background

For the first time in the promotions history, it is going to hold 3 title fights in one night. 

Results

Maximum Fighting Championship (2014) Events

MFC 39

MFC 39 - No Remorse took place on January 17, 2014, at the Northlands Expo Centre in Edmonton, Alberta.

Results

MFC 40

MFC 40 - Crowned Kings took place on May 9, 2014, at the Shaw Convention Centre in Edmonton, Alberta.

Results

References

Events in Edmonton
Maximum Fighting Championship events
2012 in mixed martial arts